The Réunion seahorse (Hippocampus borboniensis) is a synonym of Hippocampus kuda, Weber, 1913. It is found in Madagascar, Mauritius, Mozambique, Réunion, South Africa, and Tanzania. Its natural habitat is subtidal aquatic beds. It is threatened by habitat loss.

Sources 

 Project Seahorse 2003.  Hippocampus borboniensis.   2006 IUCN Red List of Threatened Species. Downloaded on 4 August 2007.

Hippocampus (genus)
Fish described in 1870
Taxa named by Auguste Duméril
Vertebrates of Réunion
Taxonomy articles created by Polbot